The Vegetable Market in Amsterdam is an oil on canvas painting by the Dutch painter Gabriël Metsu, created c. 1660-1661. It is an example of Dutch Golden Age painting and is part of the collection of the Louvre, in Paris.

Hofstede de Groot in 1908 wrote; "It is an excellent work, but it is in an exceedingly damaged condition. The trees are not, on the whole, well rendered; it is obvious that Metsu was no landscape painter..."

Sm. says (1833):—"This capital picture has had the reputation of being the chef d'œuvre of the master, and the large prices for which it has been sold go far to confirm that opinion. The writer, however, can by no means subscribe to it, for there are several described in this work that possess much higher claims to the admiration of the connoisseur."

The work is 38 and 32.5 inches, on canvas. It was at one point in the collection of King Louis XVI and is now in the Louvre.

Details
This painting was recently cleaned which makes it possible to observe more  details than before:

References

External links
 Entry 1 for The Vegetable Market at Amsterdam in Smith, 1908 reprint
 Atlas entry for Louvre works on display
 Discussion of the theatrical aspects of this painting on Louvre website

1661 paintings
Paintings in the Louvre by Dutch, Flemish and German artists
Paintings by Gabriël Metsu
Dogs in art
Amsterdam in art
Genre paintings